Schefflera spruceana is a species of flowering plant in the family Araliaceae. It is endemic to Brazil, Colombia, and Venezuela.

References 

spruceana
Flora of Brazil
Flora of Colombia

Flora of Venezuela